St. Vrain is an unincorporated community in Curry County, New Mexico, United States. St. Vrain had a post office until it closed on August 1, 2011; it still has its own ZIP code, 88133.

References

Unincorporated communities in Curry County, New Mexico
Unincorporated communities in New Mexico